R. Keith Olberg (born October 29, 1960 in Chicago, Illinois) is an American politician from California. He is a member of the Republican party. From 1994 to 2000 he represented the Apple Valley-Victorville-Hesperia based 34th district in the California State Assembly.

In 1994, freshman Assemblywoman Kathleen Honeycutt (R-Hesperia) opted at the last minute not to seek reelection due to health reasons. She did not inform any GOP officials of her decision, but did tell then unknown Olberg, a consultant with the Building Industry Association, and also endorsed him.  Although he was eventually joined in the race by veteran Victorville City Councilman Michael Rothschild, the tip off helped Olberg win the GOP primary easily, scoring 65% of the vote.

He won easy reelections in 1996 and 1998 in the vast, sparsely populated and overwhemingly safe GOP district.

California Secretary of State Election
In 2002 Olberg ran for California Secretary of State. He won the GOP primary with 62% of the vote, then narrowly lost the general election to Assemblyman Kevin Shelley (D-San Francisco) 42.3 % to 46.3%.

Electoral history

References

JoinCalifornia, Election History for the State of California

Republican Party members of the California State Assembly
1960 births
Living people